Gold from Weepah is a 1927 American silent Western film directed by William Bertram and starring Bill Cody, Doris Dawson and Dick La Reno.

Cast
 Bill Cody as Bill Carson 
 Doris Dawson as Elsie Blaine 
 Dick La Reno
 Joseph Harrington
 Fontaine La Rue
 David Dunbar

References

External links
 

1927 films
1927 Western (genre) films
Films directed by William Bertram
American black-and-white films
Pathé Exchange films
Silent American Western (genre) films
1920s English-language films
1920s American films